Artyom Aleksandrovich Poplevchenkov (born 9 June 2000) is a Russian football player who plays for FC Balashikha.

Club career
He made his debut in the Russian Football National League for FC Spartak-2 Moscow on 8 August 2020 in a game against FC Torpedo Moscow.

References

External links
 
 Profile by Russian Football National League
 

2000 births
Footballers from Moscow
Living people
Russian footballers
Russia youth international footballers
Association football goalkeepers
FC Spartak-2 Moscow players
FC Spartak Moscow players
FC Urozhay Krasnodar players
Russian First League players
Russian Second League players